Tina Ann Barrett (born 16 September 1976) is an English singer and actress. Her major breakthrough came in 1999 when she became a member of the pop group, S Club 7. She has been a member of spin-off group S Club Allstars (previously "S Club 3") since 2014. She is also a former member of the girl group Mis-Teeq, though she never appeared on any of their recordings.

Early life 
Tina Barrett was born in Hammersmith, London, England to an English father and a Guyanese mother. She was at London's Arts Educational School for a period of eight years. Her first job was dancing in a pantomime with Lionel Blair, and was also a dancer in videos and TV performances for different music artists, most notably Pulp as a showgirl in their video for "This Is Hardcore", and as an extra in the video for "You're the One I Love" by Shola Ama. She was originally going to be in the group Face2Face, which later went on to become Mis-Teeq. She assisted with the group's choreography during her time there.

Career

1996–1998: Mis-Teeq 

In 1996, Barrett, Alesha Dixon and Sabrina Washington became friends in a dance studio in Fulham. The trio, named Face2Face, performed singing and dancing. The group had started work on their debut album when Barrett left to join S Club 7 after a successful audition for Simon Fuller. After her departure, the group changed their name to Mis-Teeq and replaced her with two new members, Su-Elise Nash and Zena McNally.

1999–2003: S Club 7 and hiatus 

Barrett became a member of S Club 7 after a series of auditions, along with members Paul Cattermole, Jon Lee, Bradley McIntosh, Jo O'Meara, Hannah Spearritt and Rachel Stevens in 1999. During five years they released four number one singles and one number one album. They also had a series of TV shows, which were: Miami 7, L.A. 7, Hollywood 7 and Viva S Club, and they also starred in a film, Seeing Double. Barrett led some of the tracks on the groups' albums, such as "I'll Be There" and "Stronger", which was set to be a single, but was canceled when Paul Cattermole left the group. Barrett co-wrote two other songs that she also led: "Discotek" (the B-side to the single "Alive") and "Secret Love", a song from the group's final album Seeing Double. The six remaining members stayed together as "S Club" until 2003, when they split after releasing their greatest hits album.

When the group announced they were to break up, Barrett expressed interest in working on a solo career, but she was unsuccessful to sign with a label or an entrepreneur. She took a nine-year hiatus from her career, appearing only on red carpets and social events.

2012–present: Music releases, S Club Allstars and S Club 7 reunion 
In May 2012, a teaser video for Barrett's debut solo single "Fire" was released on YouTube and a short clip of the still unfinished video was shown during an interview on LIVE!. The final version of the music video was finally released on 27 September 2012. Barrett announced that her debut album would be released in the end of 2013 and that she intends to tour with the album, but the album has not yet materialised. Barrett has also appeared in other music videos which include Russell Grant's version of "The Clapping Song" and as the main dancer in Asian artist Navin Kundra's song "Shudaayi". Barrett is also heard in a song called "Boom" by Old Boy which also features rapper Nasty Jack; an accompanying music video has been shot but has not yet been released. In 2014 Barrett joined with O'Meara, McIntosh and Cattermole in the S Club 3, which became S Club Party.

In November 2014, Barrett reunited with the full group for a medley of S Club 7's greatest hits on BBC Children in Need. Later, the group announced a sold out arena reunion tour, titled Bring It All Back 2015, which toured the UK in May 2015. Following the reunion tour, Barrett continued to perform with O'Meara and McIntosh as S Club 3. In November 2016, Barrett released the single "All Fired Up". In January 2020, Barrett released "Mwah Mwah", along with the music video filmed in Canada during the S Club 3 tour in the summer of 2019. When O'Meara left in 2020, she was replaced the following year by S Club 8 original member Stacey Franks, and the group was renamed "S Club Allstars".

S Club 7 announced another reunion in February 2023, marking their 25th anniversary.

Personal life 
In March 2016, Barrett announced she was pregnant with her first child. Three months later, she gave birth to a boy named Roman.

Discography

Singles

Music videos

Stage work

Filmography

References

External links 
Tina Barrett's Instagram account

1976 births
English women pop singers
English people of Guyanese descent
Living people
Mis-Teeq members
People from Hammersmith
S Club 7 members
21st-century English women singers
21st-century English singers
21st-century English actresses